The International Congress of Orientalists, initiated in Paris in 1873, was an international conference of Orientalists (initially mostly scholars from Europe and the USA). The first thirteen meetings were held in Europe; the fourteenth congress was held in Algiers in 1905 and some of the subsequent conferences were also held outside Europe. Papers were primarily about philology and archaeology. The Proceedings of the Congresses were published. The work of the International Congress of Orientalists is carried on by the International Congress of Asian and North African Studies.

Congress locations and dates

 1st International Congress of Orientalists – Paris, 1873
 2nd International Congress of Orientalists – London, 1874
 3rd International Congress of Orientalists – St Petersburg, 1876
 4th International Congress of Orientalists – Florence, 1878
 5th International Congress of Orientalists – Berlin, 1881
 6th International Congress of Orientalists – Leiden, 1883
 7th International Congress of Orientalists – Vienna, 1886
 8th International Congress of Orientalists – Stockholm and Christiania, 1889
 9th International Congress of Orientalists – London, 1892
 10th International Congress of Orientalists – Geneva, 1894
 11th International Congress of Orientalists – Paris, 1897
 12th International Congress of Orientalists – Rome, 1899 
 13th International Congress of Orientalists – Hamburg, 1904
 14th International Congress of Orientalists – Algiers, 1905 – the first Congress outside Europe
 15th International Congress of Orientalists – Copenhagen, 1908
 16th International Congress of Orientalists – Athens, 1912
 17th International Congress of Orientalists – Oxford, 1928
 18th International Congress of Orientalists – Leiden, 1931
 19th International Congress of Orientalists – Rome, 1935
 20th International Congress of Orientalists – Brussels, 1938
 21st International Congress of Orientalists – Paris, 1948
 22nd International Congress of Orientalists – Istanbul, 1951
 23rd International Congress of Orientalists – Cambridge, 1954
 24th International Congress of Orientalists – Munich, 1957
 25th International Congress of Orientalists – Moscow, 1960
 26th International Congress of Orientalists – New Delhi, 1964
 27th International Congress of Orientalists – Ann Arbor, 1967 – the first Congress in the USA	
 28th International Congress of Orientalists – Canberra, 1971
 29th International Congress of Orientalists – Paris, 1974

Proceedings and transactions
 2nd – Report of the proceedings of the second International Congress of Orientalists held in London, 1874 (London, Trübner, 1874). The Rosetta Stone was viewed.
 4th – Atti del IV congresso internazionale degli orientalisti. Tenuto in Firenze nel settembre 1878. (Firenze, 1881.)
 6th – Bulletin du sixième Congrès international des orientalistes. Leide, 1883 (Leyden? 1883).
 9th – Transactions of the Ninth International Congress of Orientalists. Held in London, 1892. Edited by E. Delmar Morgan. (London, 1893).
 10th – Report of the Transliteration Committee, about the transliteration of the Arabic, Sanskrit and Pali alphabets. Held in Geneva, 1894.
 14th – Actes du XIVe Congrès international des orientalistes. Alger, 1905 (Paris, 1906–08).
 17th – Proceedings of the seventeenth International congress of orientalists, Oxford, 1928 (Nendeln, Liechtenstein : Kraus Reprint, 1968).
 22nd – Proceedings of the Twenty Second Congress of Orientalists held in Istanbul, September 15 to 22, 1951. Edited by Zeki Velidi Togan (Istanbul, 1953-).
 23rd – Proceedings of the Twenty-Third International Congress of Orientalists : Cambridge, 21–28 August 1954, ed. Denis Sinor (Nendeln/Liechtenstein : Kraus, 1974).
 26th – Proceedings of the Twenty-Sixth International Congress of Orientalists : New Delhi 4–10 January 1964, ed. R N Dandekar (Poona Bhandarkar Oriental Research Inst. 1970).
 27th – Proceedings of the Twenty-Seventh International Congress of Orientalists. Ann Arbor, Michigan, 13–19 August 1967. Ed. by Denis Sinor with the assistance of Tania Jacques, Ralph Larson, Mary-Elizabeth Meek (Wiesbaden: Otto Harrassowitz, 1971).
 28th – Proceedings of the 28 International Congress of Orientalists, Canberra, 6–12 January 1971, edited by A R Davis (Sydney : University of Sydney/Department of Oriental Studies, cop. 1976).

References

External links
International Congress of Orientalists on Worldcat.org

Orientalism
Oriental studies
Academic conferences